"Aerosol Can" is a song produced and performed by American electronic music group Major Lazer and American recording artist Pharrell Williams. Williams co-wrote the song with Major Lazer member Diplo. The song was released as a single on 14 February 2014 and features on Major Lazer's 2014 extended play Apocalypse Soon. It became a top 40 single in Australia peaking at #37. It was featured in the soundtrack for the video games "NBA 2K15" and "Watch Dogs 2".

A remix contest was held for the track in April, in which the winner was announced in the end of May.

Charts

References

2014 singles
2014 songs
Major Lazer songs
Pharrell Williams songs
Songs written by Diplo
Songs written by Pharrell Williams